Sympistis khepri is a moth of the family Noctuidae first described by James T. Troubridge in 2008. It is found in Arizona.

References

khepri
Moths described in 2008